James Loscutoff Jr. (February 4, 1930 – December 1, 2015) was a professional basketball player for the Boston Celtics of the National Basketball Association (NBA). A forward, Loscutoff played on seven Celtics championship teams between 1956 and 1964.

Life and career 

Loscutoff was born in San Francisco, California, the son of Nellie George (Ramzoff) and James Loscutoff. His parents were Spiritual Christian Molokans from Russia. He starred in basketball at Palo Alto High School, graduating in 1948. Loscutoff then attended Grant Technical College, a two-year college near Sacramento, California, before proceeding to the University of Oregon.  In his final season at Oregon, Loscutoff led the team in scoring and rebounding with 19.6 points per game and 17.2 rebounds per game.  He still holds the Oregon school record for rebounds in a game, with 32.

He was originally drafted by coach Red Auerbach to provide some much-needed defensive nerve for the Celtics team, which (despite becoming the first team to average 100 points per game in the 1954–55 season) had one of the worst defensive records in the league.

During his rookie year, Loscutoff set a then-record for the Celtics with 26 rebounds in a game.  In the 1957 NBA Finals, he sank the final two free throws of a 125–123 double-overtime victory over the St. Louis Hawks in game seven, as the Celtics won their first NBA championship. Loscutoff missed most of the 1957–58 season due to a knee injury, working closely with Auerbach on his rehabilitation. He successfully returned to the Celtics and was a member of six more championship teams.

In nine NBA seasons, from 1955–56 to 1963–64, Loscutoff was a member of seven championships as part of the legendary Celtics teams of the 1960s. A small forward, he was sometimes described as the Celtics hatchet man. His defense and strength were part of the defensive greatness of the 1960s Celtics, alongside Hall-of-Famer Bill Russell.

Loscutoff's nicknames included "Jungle Jim" and "Loscy". The organization wished to honor Loscutoff, but he asked that his jersey number (18) not be retired, so that a future Celtic could wear it. Instead, the Celtics added a banner with his nickname "Loscy" to the retired number banners hanging from the rafters of their arenas. The number was later retired in honor of another Celtic great, Dave Cowens.

Loscutoff coached the basketball team at Boston State College from 1964 to 1976 and compiled a record of 219–92 with the Warriors. In 1980, he was a member of the inaugural class of inductees to the Oregon Sports Hall of Fame.

Loscutoff lived in Florida and Andover, Massachusetts, where his family owns a day camp for children. His wife was artist Lynn Loscutoff. He died in Naples, Florida, on December 1, 2015, from complications of Parkinson's disease and pneumonia.

NBA career statistics

Regular season

Playoffs 

Note: Following the 1959–60 regular season, Loscutoff did not play in the 1960 postseason due to injury.

References

External links 

Career Statistics on databasebasketball.com

1930 births
2015 deaths
Amateur Athletic Union men's basketball players
American men's basketball players
American people of Russian descent
Basketball players from San Francisco
Boston Celtics draft picks
Boston Celtics players
Junior college men's basketball players in the United States
National Basketball Association players with retired numbers
Oregon Ducks men's basketball players
Palo Alto High School alumni
Small forwards
Women's Professional Basketball League coaches